The Morgan Plus 4 (or +4) is an automobile produced by the Morgan Motor Company. It is a more powerful and, in the case of the earlier cars, a slightly longer version of the company's previous 4/4 model. Plus 4 production ran from 1950 to 1969. It was revived in 1985 and filled the gap between the 4/4 and the Plus 8 until 2000. It was again produced from 2005 until it was replaced in 2020 by the "all new" Plus Four built on a bonded aluminium platform.

History
After World War II Morgan re-introduced their 4/4 model fitted with a 1267 cc Standard engine. This continued in production until it was replaced by the larger Plus 4 announced at the 1950 Earl's Court Motor Show.

Hydraulic brakes, initially all drum, were fitted for the first time on a Morgan.

In 1953 a higher performance version was announced with the 1991 cc I4 engine as used in the Triumph TR2 (a development of the Vanguard motor). The radiator grille was now surrounded by a cowl that blended into the bonnet. Front disc brakes became an option in 1959 and were standardised in 1960. From 1955 the 1991 cc Triumph TR3 engine was used and from 1962 the engine was the Triumph TR4 unit, which increased displacement to 2138 cc.

In 1955 the less powerful 4/4 model re-appeared in phase II form. The  wheelbase of the Plus 4 was adopted by the 4/4 when it reappeared, after which the two models were for most purposes the same length and width.

Body styles available were a 2-seat sports, 4 seat sports and more luxurious 2 or 4 seat drophead coupé (and a 4 seat coupé 1954–1956 only). In 1963 a fibreglass bodied coupe Morgan +4+ was announced, but only 26 were built.

The bonnet of the Triumph-engined Plus 4 fitted so closely to the engine that there was no room for an air filter.

Following success at Le Mans a higher performance version, the Plus 4 Super Sports, was available from 1962 with a tuned engine and a lightweight body. Just over 100 were built.

The then Swiss Morgan Importer, Rolf Wehrlin in Aesch/BL, developed a coupé version of the Morgan +4. To make up for the extra weight of the body, the engine was fitted with a Judson supercharger.

Competition use
Four wheel Morgan cars have been used in competition since HFS Morgan drove the prototype 4-4 in the MCC Exeter Trial in December 1935. Plus 4 highlights include:

Chris Lawrence and Richard Shepherd-Barron won the 1601-2000cc GT class at the 1962 24 Hours of Le Mans driving a Plus Four. The class winning car, chassis number 4840, was originally registered XRX 1 in 1961, then changed to TOK 258 from late 1961 through mid-1964 (at least different 4 Morgans have carried the TOK 258 registration number). It was sold by Chris Lawrence to A. Dence in 1964 and the registration was changed to JHX 142B.

In 1964 Chris Lawrence and John Sprinzel (Sprinzel LawrenceTune Racing) developed a streamlined aluminum coupe body for racing. The first SLR was fitted to a Triumph TR4 chassis, but the final three were fitted to Morgan +4s.

From February 1966 to November 1966 Morgan produced the two-seater +4 Competition model, of which only 42 were built. It is estimated that only approximately 11 of these still exist today. The Morgan +4 Competition model was approximately 10% more expensive than the standard +4. The Competition model had a low-line steel body, similar to the Morgan "Super Sports" aluminum body, and generally came with a Derrington four branch exhaust manifold, Derrington competition steering wheel, 72-spoke wire wheels, Armstrong select-a-ride electrically adjustable rear shock absorbers, and the 2.2-litre twin SU carburetor TR4 engine. Ref: "Morgan First and Last of the Real Sports Cars" by Gregory Houston Bowden (1972), and "The Four Wheeled Morgan" Volume 2: The Cowled-Radiator Models by Ken Hill (1980)

Performance
A TR3 engined two seater car was tested by the British magazine The Motor in 1958. The test car cost £1017 including taxes of £340.

Appearances in popular culture
In the film The War of the Roses, Barbara Rose (Kathleen Turner) buys her husband (Michael Douglas) a 1960 +4. After their marriage sours, she destroys the Morgan by crushing it under her GMC Jimmy.

The wealthy heiress and debutante who is the subject of the Frank Zappa song "Florentine Pogen" drives "a '59 Morgan."

See also
Morgan +4+

References

External links
Morgan Workshop Manual

4
Sports cars
Cars introduced in 1950
1960s cars
1980s cars
1990s cars
2000s cars
2010s cars